Marcella is a 1937 Italian drama film directed by Guido Brignone and starring Emma Gramatica, Caterina Boratto and Antonio Centa. It is based on a play by Victorien Sardou.

The film's sets were designed by the art director Guido Fiorini.

Cast
 Emma Gramatica as La baronessa Contuni 
 Caterina Boratto as Marcella 
 Antonio Centa as Oliviero 
 Mino Doro as Renato 
 Aristide Baghetti
 Mario Ferrari
 Paolo Stoppa
 Guglielmo Barnabò
 Giuseppe Addobbati
 Nada Fiorelli
 Gian Paolo Rosmino
 Rina Molé
 Luigi Pellegrini
 Laura Redi

References

Bibliography 
 Goble, Alan. The Complete Index to Literary Sources in Film. Walter de Gruyter, 1999.

External links 
 

1937 films
Italian drama films
Italian black-and-white films
1937 drama films
1930s Italian-language films
Films directed by Guido Brignone
Italian films based on plays
Films based on works by Victorien Sardou
1930s Italian films